Hythe railway station may refer to the following railway stations in England:
 Hythe railway station (Romney, Hythe and Dymchurch Railway), a terminus in Hythe, Kent, on the Romney, Hythe and Dymchurch Railway.
 Hythe railway station (South Eastern Railway), a closed station in Hythe, Kent, on the SER main line's former branch line from Sandling to Sandgate.
 Hythe railway station (Essex) on the Sunshine Coast Line Railway.
 Hythe railway station (Hampshire) on the closed branch line from Totton to Fawley.
 Hythe Road railway station, a proposed railway station in West London.
 the pair of stations on the 2 foot gauge railway that forms part of the Hythe Pier, Railway and Ferry in Hampshire.